Number systems have progressed from the use of fingers and tally marks, perhaps more than 40,000 years ago, to the use of sets of glyphs able to represent any conceivable number efficiently. The earliest known unambiguous notations for numbers emerged in Mesopotamia about 5000 or 6000 years ago.

Prehistory 

Counting initially involves the fingers, given that digit-tallying is common in number systems that are emerging today, as is the use of the hands to express the numbers five and ten. In addition, the majority of the world's number systems are organized by tens, fives, and twenties, suggesting the use of the hands and feet in counting, and cross-linguistically, terms for these amounts are etymologically based on the hands and feet. Finally, there are neurological connections between the parts of the brain that appreciate quantity and the part that "knows" the fingers (finger gnosia), and these suggest that humans are neurologically predisposed to use their hands in counting. Since the capacity and persistence of the fingers are limited, finger-counting is typically supplemented by means of devices with greater capacity and persistence, including tallies made of wood or other materials. While finger-counting is typically not something that preserves archaeologically, some prehistoric hand stencils have been interpreted as finger-counting since of the 32 possible patterns the fingers can produce, only five (the ones typically used in counting from one to five) are found at Cosquer Cave, France.

Possible tally marks made by carving notches in wood, bone, and stone appear in the archaeological record at least forty thousand years ago. These tally marks may have been used for counting time, such as numbers of days or lunar cycles, or for keeping records of quantities, such as numbers of animals or other valuable commodities. However, there is currently no diagnostic technique that can reliably determine the social purpose or use of prehistoric linear marks inscribed on surfaces, and contemporary ethnographic examples show that similar artifacts are made and used for non-numerical purposes.

The Lebombo bone is a baboon fibula with incised markings discovered in the Lebombo Mountains located between South Africa and Eswatini. The bone has been dated to 42,000 years ago. According to The Universal Book of Mathematics the Lebombo bone's 29 notches suggest that "it may have been used as a lunar phase counter, in which case African women may have been the first mathematicians, because keeping track of menstrual cycles requires a lunar calendar". However, the bone is clearly broken at one end, so the 29 notches might only represent a portion of a larger sequence. Similar artifacts from contemporary societies, like those of Australia, also suggest that such notches can serve mnemonic or conventional functions, rather than meaning numbers.

The Ishango bone is an artifact with a sharp piece of quartz affixed to one end, perhaps for engraving. It has been dated to 25,000 years ago. The artifact was first thought to be a tally stick, as it has a series of what has been interpreted as tally marks carved in three rows running the length of the tool. The first row has been interpreted as the prime numbers between 10 and 20 (i.e., 19, 17, 13, and 11), while a second row appears to add and subtract 1 from 10 and 20 (i.e., 9, 19, 21, and 11); the third row contains amounts that might be halves and doubles, though these are inconsistent. Noting the statistical probability of producing such numbers by accident, researchers like Jean de Heinzelin have suggested that the notch groupings indicate a mathematical understanding far beyond simple counting. It has also been suggested that the marks might have been made for a utilitarian purpose, like creating a better grip for the handle, or for some other non-mathematical reason. The purpose and meaning of the notches continue to be debated in academic literature.

Clay tokens 

The earliest known writing for record keeping emerged from a system of accounting that used small clay tokens. The earliest artifacts claimed to be tokens are from Tell Abu Hureyra, a site in the Upper Euphrates valley in Syria dated to the 10th millennium BCE, and Ganj-i-Dareh Tepe, a site in the Zagros region of Iran dated to the 9th millennium BCE.

To create a record that represented "two sheep", two tokens each representing one unit were used. Different types of objects were also counted differently. Within the counting system used with most discrete objects (including animals like sheep), there was a token for one item (units), a different token for ten items (tens), a different token for six tens (sixties), etc. Tokens of different sizes and shapes were used to record higher groups of ten or six in a sexagesimal number system. Different combinations of token shapes and sizes encoded the different counting systems. Archaeologist Denise Schmandt-Besserat has argued that the plain geometric tokens used for numbers were accompanied by complex tokens that identified the commodities being enumerated. For ungulates like sheep, this complex token was a flat disk marked with a quartered circle. However, the purported use of complex tokens has also been criticized on a number of grounds.

Use with bullae and numerical impressions 

To ensure that tokens were not lost or altered in their type or quantity, they were placed into clay envelopes shaped like hollow balls known as bullae (a bulla). Ownership and witness seals were impressed on bullae surfaces, which might also be left plain. If tokens needed to be verified after the bulla containing them was sealed, the bulla had to be broken open. Around the mid-fourth millennium BCE, tokens began being pressed into a bulla's outer surface before being sealed inside, presumably to avoid the need to break open the bulla to see them. This process created external impressions on bullae surfaces that corresponded to the enclosed tokens in their sizes, shapes, and quantities. Eventually, the redundancy created by the tokens inside and impressions outside a bulla seems to have been recognized, and impressions on flat tablets became the preferred method of recording numerical information. The correspondences between impressions and tokens, and the chronology of forms they comprised, were initially noticed and published by scholars like Piere Amiet.

By the time that the numerical impressions provided insight into ancient numbers, the Sumerians had already developed a complex arithmetic. Computations were likely performed either with tokens or by means of an abacus or counting board.

Numerical signs and numerals

Proto-cuneiform 

In the mid-to-late-fourth millennium BCE, numerical impressions used with bullae were replaced by numerical tablets bearing proto-cuneiform numerals impressed into clay with a round stylus held at different angles to produce the various shapes used for numerical signs. As was true of tokens and the numerical impressions on the outside of bullae, each numerical sign represented both the commodity being counted and the quantity or volume of that commodity. These numerals were soon accompanied by small pictures that identified the commodity being enumerated. The Sumerians counted different types of objects differently. As understood through analyses of early proto-cuneiform notations from the city of Uruk, there were more than a dozen different counting systems, including a general system for counting most discrete objects (such as animals, tools, and people) and specialized systems for counting cheese and grain products, volumes of grain (including fractional units), land areas, and time. Object-specified counting is not unusual and has been documented for contemporary peoples around the world; such modern systems provide good insight into how the ancient Sumerian number systems likely functioned.

Cuneiform 

Around 2700 BCE, the round stylus began to be replaced by a reed stylus that produced the wedge-shaped impressions that give cuneiform signs their name. As was the case with the tokens, numerical impressions, and proto-cuneiform numerals, cuneiform numerals are today sometimes ambiguous in the numerical values they represent. This ambiguity is partly because the base unit of an object-specified counting system is not always understood, and partly because the Sumerian number system lacked a convention like a decimal point to differentiate integers from fractions or higher exponents from lower ones. About 2100 BCE, a common sexagesimal number system with place-value developed and was used to aid conversions between object-specified counting systems. A decimal version of the sexagesimal number system, today called Assyro-Babylonian Common, developed in the second millennium BCE, reflecting the increased influence of Semitic peoples like the Akkadians and Eblaites; while today it is less well known than its sexagesimal counterpart, it would eventually become the dominant system used throughout the region, especially as Sumerian cultural influence began to wane.

Sexagesimal numerals were a mixed radix system that retained the alternating bases of 10 and 6 that characterized tokens, numerical impressions, and proto-cuneiform numerical signs. Sexagesimal numerals were used in commerce, as well as for astronomical and other calculations. In Arabic numerals, sexagesimal is still used today to count time (second per minute; minutes per hour), and angles (degrees).

Roman numerals 
The Roman numerals developed from Etruscan symbols around the middle of the 1st millennium BCE. In the Etruscan system, the symbol 1 was a single vertical mark, the symbol 10 was two perpendicularly crossed tally marks, and the symbol 100 was three crossed tally marks (similar in form to a modern asterisk *); while 5 (an inverted V shape) and 50 (an inverted V split by a single vertical mark) were perhaps derived from the lower halves of the signs for 10 and 100, there is no convincing explanation as to how the Roman symbol for 100, C, was derived from its asterisk-shaped Etruscan antecedent.

See also

References

Bibliography

Further reading

External links 
 

Numeral systems
 
Numerals
Numeral systems
Sumer